José Morales Berriguete, better known as Moleiro (30 March 1915 – 16 June 1999) was a Spanish professional association football player.

Moleiro was born in Carabanchel, Madrid on 30 March 1915. He spent his career playing as a midfielder. The most important part of his career was playing for Real Madrid C.F. in over 100 matches, scoring 10 times. Moleiro died on 16 June 1999, at the age of 84.

Clubs

International selection
He played only one match for Spain national football team, on March 11, 1945, in 2-2 draw with Portugal.

References

 

1915 births
1999 deaths
Association football midfielders
Real Madrid CF players
Spanish footballers
Spain international footballers